Before Midnight may refer to:

 Before Midnight (2013 film)
 Before Midnight (novel), published in 1955 by American author Rex Stout
 Before Midnight (1925 film)
 Before Midnight (1933 film), a film starring Ralph Bellamy

See also

 
 
 After Midnight (disambiguation)
 At Midnight (disambiguation)